Steven Barr is an American actor who voiced Urdnot Wrex in the Mass Effect trilogy.

Filmography

Film

Television

Video games

References

External links

Living people
American male voice actors
American male film actors
Year of birth missing (living people)
Place of birth missing (living people)